Parascotia is a genus of moths of the family Erebidae. The genus was erected by Jacob Hübner in 1825.

Taxonomy
The genus has previously been classified in the subfamily Calpinae of the family Noctuidae.

Species
 Parascotia detersa Staudinger, 1891
 Parascotia fuliginaria Linnaeus, 1761 – waved black moth
 Parascotia lorai Agenjo, 1967
 Parascotia nisseni Turati, 1905

References

 Agenjo (1967). Eos 43: 8, pl. 1, figs. 2 & 5.
 Linnaeus (1761). Fauna Suecica
 
 Staudinger (1891). Deutsche Entom. Zeitsch., Ges., Iris zu Dresden 4: 333, pl. 4, f. 14.
 Turati (1905). Naturalista Siciliano 18: 42, pl. 8, f. 1.

Boletobiinae
Noctuoidea genera